Jonas Björkman and Todd Woodbridge were the defending champions, but did not participate together this year.  Björkman partnered Max Mirnyi, losing in the first round.  Woodbridge retired from professional tennis earlier in the year.

Bob Bryan and Mike Bryan won in the final 6–4, 6–7(3), 6–4, against Mark Knowles and Daniel Nestor.

Seeds

Draw

Draw

External links
Draw

2005 BNP Paribas Masters
2005 ATP Tour